Frédéric Reiss (born 12 November 1949) is a French teacher and politician of the Republicans who has been serving as a member of the National Assembly of France since the 2002 elections, representing the Bas-Rhin department. On the local level, he is the mayor of Niederbronn-les-Bains, Bas-Rhin.

Political career
In parliament, Reiss has been serving on the Committee on Cultural Affairs and Education since 2002. In this capacity, he was the parliament's rapporteur on the national budget for research in 2020.

In addition to his committee assignments, Reiss is part of the French-Moldovan Parliamentary Friendship Group. In 2019, he also joined the Franco-German Parliamentary Assembly.

Other activities
 Franco-German Youth Office, Member of the Board of Directors

Political positions
Ahead of the 2017 elections, Reiss endorsed François Fillon as the Republican's candidate for president. Ahead of the 2022 presidential elections, he publicly declared his support for Michel Barnier as the Republicans’ candidate. He did not seek re-election in the 2022 French legislative election.

References

1949 births
Living people
People from Haguenau
Mayors of places in Grand Est
Radical Party (France) politicians
Union for a Popular Movement politicians
The Republicans (France) politicians
The Social Right
Modern and Humanist France
Deputies of the 12th National Assembly of the French Fifth Republic
Deputies of the 13th National Assembly of the French Fifth Republic
Deputies of the 14th National Assembly of the French Fifth Republic
Deputies of the 15th National Assembly of the French Fifth Republic
French people of German descent

Members of Parliament for Bas-Rhin